State Route 25 (SR 25) is a  state highway in the U.S. state of Alabama. From U.S. Route 78 (US 78) in Leeds northeast to its terminus at the Georgia state line, SR 25 is the unsigned partner route of US 411. The southwestern terminus of SR 25 is at its intersection with SR 5 near Pine Hill in Wilcox County.

Route description

Alabama State Route 25 is one of Alabama's longest state routes - and one of its most diverse. 

After turning directly north away from Alabama State Route 5 in Sunny South, the route winds its way north to  Greensboro, one of its largest cities in its portion west of Interstate 65. 

After leaving Greensboro, the route winds north-northeast through the Talladega National Forest  Oakmulgee District. Upon its second junction with SR-5, the route winds through  Centreville before heading east-northeast through  Montevallo,  Calera, and  Columbiana. 

The portion of the route from Centreville to  Vincent encompasses a portion of a wide eastern beltway of sorts around  Birmingham with U.S. Route 231 and Alabama State Route 160. 

In  Wilsonville, the route turns due north and heads to its junction with US-231/ 280 in  Harpersville. After a short concurrency with US-231, the route winds its way across Double Oak Mountain on a fairly curvy routing (See below). Upon reaching  US-78 and  US-411, signed SR-25 comes to an end as it winds north to the  Georgia state line concurrent with aforementioned US-411.

When viewed on a map, SR-25 is among the most expansive state routes in the state, terrain and length-wise; with nearly 1000ft of elevation gain along the path and passage through nine counties in the state.

The Double Oak Mountain area
SR 25 traverses one of the higher peaks in the Birmingham area, Double Oak Mountain, connecting the Coosa and Cahaba River valleys. The roadway was constructed between 1914 and 1921 with support from Buffalo Rock founder Sidney Word Lee, who owned a 3,000-acre camp in Calcis. There is also a railroad line that travels parallel with SR 25 between Vincent and Leeds that tunnels through Double Oak Mountain below the highway.

The  stretch of SR 25 between Vincent and Leeds is popular with motorcyclists and other outdoor enthusiasts. This road is off limits to heavy trucks except for local deliveries due to a large number of sharp curves, blind entrances and exits, and a narrow, elevated roadway. The small communities of Vandiver, Sterrett, Calcis, and Dunnavant straddle the highway in this area. The exclusive and private Shoal Creek Golf and Country Club, home of the 1984 and 1990 PGA Championships is located on Shelby County Route 41 not far from its intersection with SR 25.

Major intersections

References

025
025
Transportation in Wilcox County, Alabama
Transportation in Marengo County, Alabama
Transportation in Hale County, Alabama
Transportation in Bibb County, Alabama
Transportation in Shelby County, Alabama
Transportation in Jefferson County, Alabama
Transportation in St. Clair County, Alabama
Transportation in Etowah County, Alabama
Transportation in Cherokee County, Alabama